Balize may refer to:

 Belize, a country in Central America
 La Balize, Louisiana, a former French fort and settlement near the mouth of the Mississippi River
 The lobe of the Mississippi River Delta, named after the settlement